R.B. Govt. High School is a Govt. High School in Joypurhat, Bangladesh. It was established in 1946. It is one of the best school in Bangladesh.

History 
The school is named after the land donor of the school campus, Ramdeo Bazla, a prominent merchant of Joypurhat. It was nationalized on 1 June 1977.

Facilities
Classes are held in two shifts : Morning  and Day.

The school hostel has a residential capacity of 60 residents.

Every year at least 240 students can got themselves admitted into this school. Every students can participate in every events hosted by this school. Students can join different clubs which were created by the school authority.

Today
The school is considered one of the best schools in the district and more than 400 students secure GPA 5 in board exams each year.

Extracurricular activities
Computer club
Scouting
 Games and Sports (mostly Athletics, Cricket, Badminton and Football)
 Debating
 Math and Language Competitions
 Picnic
 Social Development

See also
 Education in Bangladesh
 List of schools in Bangladesh

References

Schools in Joypurhat District
High schools in Bangladesh